Wang Xuance (fl. 7th century) was a Chinese diplomat, military general, and travel writer. In 648, Tang Taizong sent him to India in response to Harshavardhana sending an ambassador to China. However once in India he discovered Harshavardhana had died and the new king Aluonashun (supposedly Arunāsva) attacked Wang and his 30 mounted subordinates. This led to Wang Xuance escaping to Tibet and then mounting a joint of over 7,000 Nepalese mounted infantry and 1,200 Tibetan infantry and attack on the Indian state on June 16. The success of this attack won Xuance the prestigious title of the "Grand Master for the Closing Court." He also secured a reported Buddhist relic for China. 2,000 prisoners were taken from Magadha by the Nepali and Tibetan forces under Wang. Tibetan and Chinese writings document describe Wang Xuance's raid on India with Tibetan soldiers. Nepal had been subdued by the Tibetan King Songtsen. The Indian pretender was among the captives. The war happened in 649. Taizong's grave had a statue of the Indian pretender. The war had lasted 3 days.

He wrote the book Zhong Tianzhu Guo Xingji (Travel Notes of Central India), which included a wealth of geographical information.

References 

Chinese travel writers
Tang dynasty diplomats
Tang dynasty generals at war against Tibet
Tang dynasty generals from Henan
Tang dynasty writers
Writers from Luoyang

zh:阿羅那順